For the mountains in Tajikistan, see the Fann Mountains.

Fan Mountain Observatory (or Fan Mountain Station of Leander McCormick Observatory), an observatory operated by the Astronomy Department of the University of Virginia in southern Albemarle County, Virginia. It was opened in 1966 with a  Tinsley reflector, with a  Baker-Schmidt astrometric reflector following in 1972, to extend the parallax work of the McCormick Observatory, which was suffering from light pollution from growing Charlottesville, Virginia by this time.

Description
Today both telescopes have been outfitted with state-of-the-art instruments and are operated nightly by university students and faculty.   The primary instruments for the  telescope are a 2048x2048 SITe CCD for direct imaging and a fiber-fed visible wavelength spectrograph, FOBOS, for general spectroscopy and precision radial velocity measurement.   The  telescope supports a 1024x1024 HAWAII-1 based HgCdTe infrared camera operating between 0.8 and 2.5 µm.  This camera is capable of direct imaging in an 8.5 x 8.5' (2.5 x 2.5 mrad) field with 0.5" (2.4 µrad) pixels as well as polarimetry and grism spectroscopy.

Viewing
Fan Mountain observatory hosts a "public night" twice each year when eyepieces are placed on the two telescopes for general viewing. At other times, the facility is closed to the public, including the grounds and road up to the observatory.

See also 
 List of observatories
 List of largest optical refracting telescopes

References

External links 
 Fan Mountain Observatory home page
 Fan Mountain Observatory Clear Sky Clock Forecast of observing conditions.

Buildings and structures in Albemarle County, Virginia
Astronomical observatories in Virginia
University of Virginia
1966 establishments in Virginia